The 2001 British Academy Television Awards were held on Sunday 13 May 2001. The ceremony took place at the Grosvenor House Hotel in Park Lane, London and was broadcast live on BBC One.

Winners
Best Actor
Winner: Michael Gambon — Longitude (Channel 4)
Other nominees: Steven Mackintosh — Care (BBC One); Pete Postlethwaite — The Sins (BBC One); Steve McFadden — EastEnders (BBC)
Best Actress
Winner: Judi Dench — The Last of the Blonde Bombshells (BBC One)
Other nominees: Geraldine James — The Sins (BBC One); Amanda Redman — At Home with the Braithwaites (ITV); Fay Ripley — Cold Feet (ITV); Alison Steadman — Fat Friends (ITV)
Best Comedy (Programme or Series)
Winner: Da Ali G Show (TalkBack Productions / Channel 4)
Other nominees: Baddiel and Skinner Unplanned (Avalon Television / ITV); Smack the Pony (TalkBack Productions / Channel 4); Victoria Wood With All The Trimmings (Good Fun / Ovation Entertainment Limited / BBC One)
Best Comedy Performance
Winner: Sacha Baron Cohen — Da Ali G Show (Channel 4)
Other nominees: Caroline Aherne — The Royle Family (BBC One); Kathy Burke — Gimme Gimme Gimme (BBC Two); Dawn French — The Vicar of Dibley (BBC One)
Best Drama Serial
Winner: Longitude (Granada Television / A&E Network / Channel 4)
Other nominees: Nature Boy (BBC / BBC Two); Never Never (Company Pictures / Channel 4); This Is Personal: The Hunt for the Yorkshire Ripper (Granada Television / ITV)
Best Drama Series
Winner: Clocking Off (Red Production Company / BBC One)
Other nominees: The Cops (World Productions / BBC Two); Fat Friends (Rollem Productions / Tiger Aspect Productions / Yorkshire Television / ITV); The Sins (BBC / BBC One)
Best Single Drama
Winner: Care (BBC / BBC One)
Other nominees: Donovan Quick (Making Waves Film & TV Limited / BBC Scotland / BBC Two); Nice Girl (BBC / BBC Two); Storm Damage (BBC / BBC Two)
Best Soap Opera
Winner: Emmerdale (Yorkshire Television / ITV)
Other nominees: Coronation Street (Granada Television / ITV); EastEnders (BBC / BBC One); Hollyoaks (Mersey Television / Channel 4)
Best News and Current Affairs Journalism
Winner: Out of Africa (Insight News Productions / CNN / Channel 4)
Other nominees: Mozambique Floods (BBC / BBC One / BBC Two); Mozambique Floods (the event and the aftermath) (ITN / ITV); Panorama — Who Bombed Omagh? (BBC / BBC One)
Best Entertainment Performance
Winner: Graham Norton — So Graham Norton (Channel 4)
Other nominees: Rory Bremner — Blair Did It All Go Wrong? (Channel 4); Angus Deayton — Have I Got News For You (BBC One / BBC Two); Paul Merton — Have I Got News For You (BBC One / BBC Two)
Best Factual Series or Strand
Winner: Britain at War in Colour (TWI / Carlton Television / ITV)
Other nominees: Castaway 2000 (Lion TV / BBC Scotland / BBC One); Fifteen (Windfall Films / Channel 4); Horizon (BBC / BBC Two)
Best Feature
Winner: The Naked Chef (Optomen / BBC Two)
Other nominees: Faking It (RDF Media / Channel 4); House of Horrors (Granada Television / ITV); What the Romans Did for Us (BBC / BBC Two)
Flaherty Award for Single Documentary
Winner: 100% White (Diverse Productions / Channel 4)
Other nominees: The Boy David - The Return (Man Alive Group / BBC One); Endurance: Shackleton and the Antarctic (White Mountain Films / NOVA / American Museum of Natural History / Channel 4); The Man Who Bought Mustique (Café Productions / Channel 4)
Huw Wheldon Award for Specialist Factual
Winner: Howard Goodall's Big Bangs (Tiger Aspect Productions / Channel 4)
Other nominees: Arena — Wisconsin Death Trip (BBC / BBC Two); Elizabeth (United Productions / Channel 4); A History of Britain by Simon Schama (BBC / BBC Two)
Entertainment Programme or Series
Winner: So Graham Norton (So Television / United Productions / Channel 4)
Other nominees: Have I Got News For You (Hat Trick Productions / BBC One / BBC Two); The Weakest Link (BBC / BBC Two); Who Wants to Be a Millionaire? (Celador / ITV)
Situation Comedy Award
Winner: Black Books (Assembly Film & Television / Channel 4)
Other nominees: Blackadder: Back & Forth (Tiger Aspect Productions / Sky One); One Foot in the Grave (BBC / BBC One); The Royle Family (Granada Television / BBC One)
Sport
Winner: Sydney Olympics 2000 (BBC / BBC One / BBC Two)
Other nominees: British Grand Prix 2000 (Mach1 / ITV); Test Cricket (Sunset + Vine / Channel 4); Today at the Paralympics (VTV Limited / BBC Two)
Led Grade Audience Award as Voted by Readers of the Radio Times
Winner: Inspector Morse — The Remorseful Day (ITV)
Other nominees: Hero of the Hour (ITV); Seeing Red (ITV); A Touch of Frost (ITV); The Vicar of Dibley (BBC One)
Innovation Award
Winner: Big Brother (Bazal / Channel 4)
Other nominees: Castaway 2000 (Lion TV / BBC Scotland / BBC One); Doctors (BBC / BBC One); Nice Girl (BBC / BBC Two)
The Dennis Potter Award
Lynda La Plante
The Alan Clarke Award
Ruth Caleb
Special Award
Coronation Street
Patrick Moore

External links
Archive of winners on official BAFTA website (retrieved February 5, 2006).
British Academy Television Awards 2001  at the Internet Movie Database.

2001
2001 awards in the United Kingdom
2001 television awards
2001 in British television
May 2001 events in the United Kingdom